Scotura aeroptera is a moth of the family Notodontidae. It is found in Costa Rica.

The length of the forewings is 12.5-13.0 mm for males and 15.5 mm for females. The ground color of the forewings is creamy bronze in the basal half and bronzy gray in the outer half. The ground color of the hindwings is glossy charcoal gray.

The larvae feed on Genipa americana

Etymology
The name is derived from a combination of the Latin word aeris (meaning bronze) and the Greek pteron (meaning wing) and refers to the unusual bronze tone of the forewing.

References

Moths described in 2008
Notodontidae of South America